Beijing Institute of Petrochemical Technology  (BIPT), founded in 1978, had been a specialist school connected to the petrochemical system. After a development initiative over decades, it became a multi-disciplinary university with eleven colleges and departments.

History
In 1978, a specialist school of petrochemical technology and its second branch was established in Beijing.
In 1985, the school was incorporated into the Sinopec, the largest oil company in China.
In 1987, a new building was cornerstoned in Daxing, the southest area of Beijing.
In 1990, the headquarters of the school moved to Daxing.
In 1992, the Beijing Institute of Petrochemical Technology was officially founded.
In 2008, the BIPT celebrated its 30th anniversary, and a special logo was designed for the grand celebration.

Colleges and departments
Chemical Engineering College
Mechanical Engineering College
Information Engineering College
School of Economics and Management
School of Humanities and Social Sciences
Material Science and Engineering Department
Mathematics and Physics Department
Foreign Languages Department
Department of Physical Education
Engineering Education Center
International Education College
Continuing Education College

Activities
The Beijing Institute of Petrochemical Technology own a practice base in Yanshan Petrochemical Group, which is located in Fangshan District. Students from chemical industry majors of BIPT come to the base every year for field work based in the factory. Students of other majors also have a chance to visit the factory for one time during their college life. This is to deepen their understanding of theoretical knowledge and strengthen their competence.

International cooperation
The BIPT has established a long-term stable cooperative relationship with some overseas universities; these universities sent students to each other to enhance academic exchanges every year.
Some of the cooperated universities:
UK University of the West of Scotland
France ESME Sudria
France  ESIEE-AMIENS
Germany University of Duisburg-Essen
Norway Narvik University College
US Columbus State University
US St. Cloud State University

In 2014, the BIPT will open a new Mastère en sciences course in partnership with ESME Sudria.

Future development
Two separated campuses in Tsingyuan and Kangzhuang have long time been a bottleneck in the university's evolution, the opening of Line 4, Beijing Subway and the construction of Beijing–Shanghai High-Speed Railway has galloped local real estate price and which made a further expansion harder than ever. A decision in spring 2011 will compel the Economic and Management College garrison in Kangzhuang campus along while other ten colleges move to Tsingyuan campus, but students and professors of E&M College have been complaining the poor conditions and dispossessed surroundings of Kangzhuang campus.

References

External links
 Official website
 Alumni Association

Universities and colleges in Beijing
Buildings and structures in Daxing District
Educational institutions established in 1978
1978 establishments in China